Manama is the capital and largest city of Bahrain, with an approximate population of 200,000 people as of 2020. Long an important trading center in the Persian Gulf, Manama is home to a very diverse population.  After periods of Portuguese and Persian control and invasions from the ruling dynasties of Saudi Arabia and Oman, Bahrain established itself as an independent nation in 1971 after a period of British hegemony.

Although the current twin cities of Manama and Muharraq appear to have been founded simultaneously in the 1800s, Muharraq took prominence due to its defensive location and was thus the capital of Bahrain until 1923. Manama became the mercantile capital and was the gateway to the main Bahrain Island. In the 20th century, Bahrain's oil wealth helped spur fast growth and in the 1990s a concerted diversification effort led to expansion in other industries and helped transform Manama into an important financial hub in the Middle East. Manama was designated as the 2012 capital of Arab culture by the Arab League, and a beta global city by the Globalization and World Cities Research Network in 2018.

Etymology
The name is derived from the Arabic word المنامة (al-Manãma) meaning "the place of rest" or "the place of dreams".

History

Pre-modern history
There is evidence of human settlement on the northern coastline of Bahrain dating back to the Bronze Age. The Dilmun civilisation inhabited the area in 3000 BC, serving as a key regional trading hub between Mesopotamia, Magan and the Indus Valley civilisation. Approximately 100,000 Dilmun burial mounds were found across the north and central regions of the country, some originating 5,000 years ago. Despite the discovery of the mounds, there is no significant evidence to suggest heavy urbanisation took place during the Dilmun era. It is believed that the majority of the population lived in rural areas, numbering several thousand. Evidence of an ancient large rural population was confirmed by one of Alexander the Great's ship captains, during voyages in the Persian Gulf. A vast system of aqueducts in northern Bahrain helped facilitate ancient horticulture and agriculture. 

The commercial network of Dilmun lasted for almost 2,000 years, after which the Assyrians took control of the island in 700 BC for more than a century. This was followed by Babylonian and Achaemenid rule, which later gave way to Greek influence during the time of Alexander the Great's conquests. In the first century AD, the Roman writer Pliny the Elder wrote of Tylos, the Hellenic name of Bahrain in the classical era, and its pearls and cotton fields. The island came under the control of the Parthian and Sassanid empires respectively, by which time Nestorian Christianity started to spread in Bahrain. By 410–420 AD, a Nestorian bishopric and monastery was established in Al Dair, on the neighbouring island of Muharraq. Following the conversion of Bahrain to Islam in 628 AD, work on one of the earliest mosques in the region, the Khamis Mosque, began as early as the seventh century AD. During this time, Bahrain was engaged in long distance marine trading, evident from the discovery of Chinese coins dating between 600 and 1200 AD, in Manama.

In 1330, under the Jarwanid dynasty, the island became a tributary of the Kingdom of Hormuz. The town of Manama was mentioned by name for the first time in a manuscript dating to 1345 AD. Bahrain, particularly Manama and the nearby settlement of Bilad Al Qadeem, became a centre of Shia scholarship and training for the ulema, it would remain so for centuries. The ulema would help fund pearling expeditions and finance grain production in the rural areas surrounding the city. In 1521, Bahrain fell to the expanding Portuguese Empire in the Persian Gulf, having already defeated Hormuz. The Portuguese consolidated their hold on the island by constructing the Bahrain Fort, on the outskirts of Manama. After numerous revolts and an expanding Safavid empire in Persia, the Portuguese were expelled from Bahrain and the Safavids took control in 1602.

Early modern history

The Safavids, sidelining Manama, designated the nearby town of Bilad Al Qadeem as the provincial capital.  The town was also the seat of the Persian governor and the Shaikh al-Islam of the islands. The position of Shaikh al-Islam lay under the jurisdiction of the central Safavid government and as such, candidates were carefully vetted by the Isfahan courts. During the Safavid era, the islands continued to be a centre for Twelver Shi'ism scholarship, producing clerics for use in mainland Persia.  Additionally, the rich agricultural northern region of Bahrain continued to flourish due to an abundance of date palm farms and orchards. The Portuguese traveler Pedro Teixeira commented on the extensive cultivation of crops like barley and wheat. The opening of Persian markets to Bahraini exports, especially pearls, boosted the islands' export economy. The yearly income of exported Bahraini pearls was 600,000 ducats, collected by around 2,000 pearling dhows. Another factor that contributed to Bahrain's agricultural wealth was the migration of Shia cultivators from Ottoman-occupied Qatif and al-Hasa, fearing religious persecution, in 1537. Sometime after 1736, Nader Shah constructed a fort on the southern outskirts of Manama (likely the Diwan Fort).

Persian control over the Persian Gulf waned during the later half of the 18th century. At this time, Bahrain archipelago was a dependency of the emirate of Bushehr, itself a part of Persia. In 1783, the Bani Utbah tribal confederation invaded Bahrain and expelled the resident governor Nasr Al-Madhkur. As a result, the Al Khalifa family became the rulers of the country, and all political relations with Bushehr and Persia/Iran were terminated.  Ahmed ibn Muhammad ibn Khalifa (later called Ahmed al-Fateh, lit. "Ahmed the conqueror") become the dynasty's first Hakim of Bahrain. Political instability in the 19th century had disastrous effects on Manama's economy; Invasions by the Omanis in 1800 and by the Wahhabis in 1810–11, in addition to a civil war in 1842 between Bahrain's co-rulers saw the town being a major battleground. The instability paralysed commercial trade in Manama; the town's port was closed, most merchants fled abroad to Kuwait and the Persian coast until hostilities ceased. The English scholar William Gifford Palgrave, on a visit to Manama in 1862, described the town as having a few ruined stone buildings, with a landscape dominated with the huts of poor fishermen and pearl-divers.

The Pax Britannica of the 19th century resulted in British consolidation of trade routes, particularly those close to the British Raj. In response to piracy in the Persian Gulf region, the British deployed warships and forced much of the Persian Gulf States at the time (including Bahrain) to sign the General Maritime Treaty of 1820, which prohibited piracy and slavery. In 1861, the Perpetual Truce of Peace and Friendship was signed between Britain and Bahrain, which placed the British in charge of defending Bahrain in exchange for British control over Bahraini foreign affairs. With the ascension of Isa ibn Ali Al Khalifa as the Hakim of Bahrain in 1869, Manama became the centre of British activity in the Persian Gulf, though its interests were initially strictly commercial. Trading recovered fully by 1873 and the country's earnings from pearl exports increased by sevenfold between 1873 and 1900. Representing the British were native agents, usually from minorities such as Persians or Huwala who regularly reported back to British India and the British political residency in Bushehr. The position of native agent was later replaced by a British political agent, following the construction of the British political residency (locally referred to in ) in 1900, which further solidified Britain's position in Manama.

Modern history

Following the outbreak of World War I in 1914, the British Raj used Manama as a military base of operations during the Mesopotamian campaign. Prompted by the presence of oil in the region, the British political agency in Bushire concluded an oil agreement with the Hakim to prohibit the exploration and exploitation of oil for a five-year period. In 1919, Bahrain was officially integrated into the British empire as an overseas imperial territory following the Bahrain order-in-council decree, issued in 1913. The decree gave the resident political agent greater powers and placed Bahrain under the residency of Bushire and therefore under the governance of the British Raj. The British pressured a series of administrative reforms in Bahrain during the 1920s (a move met with opposition from tribal leaders), during which the aging Hakim Isa ibn Ali Al Khalifa was forced to abdicate in favour of his reform-minded son Hamad ibn Isa Al Khalifa. A municipal government was established in Manama in 1919, the Customs office was reorganised in 1923 and placed under the supervision of an English businessman, the pearling industry was later reformed in 1924. Earnings from the customs office would be kept in the newly created state treasury. Civil courts were established for the first time in 1923, followed by the establishment of the Department of Land Registration in 1924. Charles Belgrave, from the Colonial office, was appointed in 1926 by the British to carry on further reforms and manage administration as a financial advisor to the King. He later organised the State Police and was in charge of the Finance and Land departments of the government.

In 1927, the country's pearling economy collapsed due to the introduction of Japanese cultured pearls in the world market. It is estimated that between 1929 and 1931, pearling entrepreneurs lost more than two-thirds of their income. Further aggravated by the Great Depression, many leading Bahraini businessmen, shopkeepers, and pearl-divers fell into debt. With the discovery of oil in 1932 and the subsequent production of oil exports in 1934, the country gained a greater significance in geopolitics. The security of oil supplies in the Middle East was a priority of the British, especially in the run-up to the Second World War. The discovery of oil led to gradual employment of bankrupt divers from the pearling industry in the 1930s, eventually causing the pearling industry to disappear. During the war, the country served as a strategic airbase between Britain and India as well as hosting RAF Muharraq and a naval base in Juffair. Bahrain was bombed by the Italian Air Force in 1940. In 1947, following the end of the war and subsequent Indian independence, the British residency of the Persian Gulf moved to Manama from Bushire.

Following the rise of Arab nationalism across the Middle East and sparked by the Suez Crisis in 1956, anti-British unrest broke out in Manama, organised by the National Union Committee. Though the NUC advocated peaceful demonstrations, buildings and enterprises belonging to Europeans (the British in particular) as well as the main Catholic church in the city and petrol stations, were targeted and set ablaze. Demonstrations held in front of the British political residency called for the dismissal of Charles Belgrave, who was later dismissed by the direct intervention of the Foreign Office the following year. A subsequent crackdown on the NUC led to the dissolution of the body. Another anti-British uprising erupted in March 1965, though predominately led by students aspiring for independence rather than by Arab nationalists. In 1968, the British announced their withdrawal from Bahrain by 1971. The newly independent State of Bahrain designated Manama as the capital city.

Post-independence Manama was characterised by the rapid urbanisation of the city and the swallowing-up of neighboring villages and hamlets into a single urbanised area, incorporating new neighbourhoods such as Adliya and Salmaniya. The construction boom attracted large numbers of foreigners from the Indian subcontinent and by 1981, foreigners outnumbered Bahrainis two-to-one. The construction of the Diplomatic Area district in the city's northeast helped facilitate diversification of the country's economy from oil by exploiting the lucrative financial industry. Financial institutions in the district numbered 187 by 1986. The scarcity of land suitable for construction led to land reclamation. Religious activism migrated from Manama to the suburban districts of Bani Jamra, Diraz and Bilad Al Qadeem, hotspots of unrest in the 1990s uprising that called for the reinstatement of an elected parliament. In 2001, the National Action Charter, presented by King Hamad bin Isa al-Khalifa was approved by Bahrainis. The charter led to the first parliamentary and municipal elections in decades. Further elections in 2006 and 2010 led to the election of Islamist parties, Al Wefaq, Al Menbar, and Al Asalah, as well as independent candidates. In 2011, a month-long uprising led to the intervention of GCC forces and the proclamation of a three-month state of emergency. The Bahrain Independent Commission of Inquiry published a 500-page report on the events of 2011.

Government 

Historically, Manama has been restricted to what is now known as the Manama Souq and the Manama Fort (now the Ministry of Interior) to its south. However the city has now grown to include a number of newer suburban developments as well as older neighboring villages that have been engulfed by the growth of the city. The districts that make up Manama today include:

Manama is part of the Capital Governorate, one of five Governorates of Bahrain.  Until 2002 it was part of the municipality of Al-Manamah. Councils exist within the governorates; eight constituencies are voted upon within Capital Governorate in 2006.

Economy 

Manama is the focal point of the Bahraini economy. While petroleum has decreased in importance in recent years due to depleting reserves and growth in other industries, it is still the mainstay of the economy. Heavy industry (e.g. aluminium smelting, ship repair), banking and finance, and tourism are among the industries which have experienced recent growth. Several multinationals have facilities and offices in and around Manama. The primary industry in Manama itself is financial services, with over two hundred financial institutions and banks based in the CBD and the Diplomatic Area. Manama is a financial hub for the Persian Gulf region and a center of Islamic banking.  There is also a large retail sector in the shopping malls around Seef, while the center of Manama is dominated by small workshops and traders.

Manama's economy in the early 20th century relied heavily on pearling; in 1907, the pearling industry was estimated to include 917 boats providing employment for up to 18,000 people. Shipbuilding also employed several hundred in both Manama and Muharraq. The estimated income earned from pearling in 1926 and subsequent years prior to the Great Depression was £1.5 million annually. Custom duties and tariffs served as the prime source of revenue for the government. With the onset of the Great Depression, the collapse of the pearling industry and the discovery of oil in 1932, the country's economy began to shift towards oil.

Historically, the ports at Manama were of poor reputation. The British described the ports importing systems as being "very bad – goods were exposed to the weather and there were long delays in delivery", in 1911. Indians began maintaining the ports and new resources were built on site, improving the situation. As of 1920, Manama was one of the main exporters of Bahrain pearls, attracting steamships from India. During this time, they also imported goods from India and from other regional countries. They imported rice, textiles, ghee, coffee, dates, tea, tobacco, fuel, and livestock. They exported less of a variety, with a focus on pearls, oysters, and sailcloth. For the year of 1911–12, Manama was visited by 52 steamships, the majority being British and the rest Turkish-Arabian.

Demographics

The role of Manama as a regional port city in the Persian Gulf made it a hub for migrant workers in search of a better living. As a result, Manama has often been described, both in the pre-oil and post-oil era, as a cosmopolitan city. In 1904, it was estimated that Manama's population numbered 25,000, out of which half were believed to have been foreigners from Basra, Najd, al-Hasa and Iran, as well as from India and Europe.

Religion

The two main branches of Islam, Shia Islam and Sunni Islam, coexisted in Manama for centuries and are represented by distinct ethnic groups. The Shia community is represented by the native Arab Baharna, the Hasawis and Qatifis of mainland Arabia and the Persian Ajam. The Sunni community is represented by Arab Bedouin tribes who migrated in the eighteenth century along with the Bani Utbah and the Huwala.

Transport

Road network 

Manama is the main hub of the country's road network. At the moment the city's road network is undergoing substantial development to ameliorate the situation of traffic in the city.  Due to the fact that it is the capital and the main city in the country, where most of the government and the commercial offices and facilities are established, along with the entertainment centers, and the country's fast growth, vehicle population is increasing rapidly.

The widening of roads in the old districts of Manama and the development of a national network linking the capital to other settlements commenced as early as the arrival of the first car in 1914. The continuous increase in the number of cars from 395 in 1944, to 3,379 in 1954 and to 18,372 cars in 1970 caused urban development to primarily focus on expanding the road network, widening carriageways and the establishment of more parking spaces. Many tracks previously laid in the pre-oil era (prior to the 1930s) were resurfaced and widened, turning them into 'road arteries'. Initial widening of the roads started in the Manama Souq district, widening its main roads by demolishing encroaching houses.

A series of ring roads were constructed (Isa al Kabeer avenue in the 1930s, Exhibition avenue in the 1960s and Al Fateh highway in the 1980s), to push back the coastline and extend the city area in belt-like forms. To the north, the foreshore used to be around Government Avenue in the 1920s but it shifted to a new road, King Faisal Road, in the early 1930s which became the coastal road. To the east, a bridge connected Manama to Muharraq since 1929, a new causeway was built in 1941 which replaced the old wooden bridge. Transits between the two islands peaked after the construction of the Bahrain International Airport in 1932.

To the south of Manama, roads connected groves, lagoons and marshes of Hoora, Adliya, Gudaibiya and Juffair. Villages such as Mahooz, Ghuraifa, Seqaya served as the end of these roads. To the west, a major highway was built that linked Manama to the isolated village port of Budaiya, this highway crossed through the 'green belt' villages of Sanabis, Jidhafs and Duraz. To the south, a road was built that connected Manama to Riffa. The discovery of oil accelerated the growth of the city's road network.

The four main islands and all the towns and villages are linked by well-constructed roads. A four-lane highway atop a  causeway, linking Bahrain with the Saudi Arabian mainland via the island of Umm an-Nasan was completed in December 1986, and financed by Saudi Arabia. In 2000, there were 172,684 passenger vehicles and 41,820 commercial vehicles.

In 2001, Bahrain had a merchant fleet of eight ships of 1,000 GT or over, totaling 270,784 GT. Private vehicles and taxis are the primary means of transportation in the city.

Buses 

Manama has a bus service that launched on 1 April 2015, with a fleet of 141 MAN buses. Regulated by the Ministry of Transportation, bus routes extend across Bahrain and around Manama with fares of a minimum 200 Fils (BD0.200) (around $0.50(USD); £0.30).

Air transport 
It is a premier hub airport in the Middle East. Strategically located in the Northern Persian Gulf between the major markets of Saudi Arabia and Iran, the airport has one of the widest range and highest frequency of regional services with connections to major international destinations in Europe, Asia, Africa, and North America.
Bahrain also has a military airbase, the Isa Air Base, located in the south at Sakhir. This is the base of the Bahrain Defence Force, or BDF.

Education 

Quranic schools were the only source of education in Bahrain prior to the 20th century; such schools were primarily dedicated to the study of the Qur'an. The first modern school to open in the country was a missionary elementary school set up in 1892 (according to one account) in Manama by the Reformed Church in America, with the school's syllabus comprising English, Mathematics and the study of Christianity. Leading merchants in the country sent their children to the school until it was closed down in 1933 due to financial difficulties. The school reopened some years later under the name of Al Raja School where it operates till the present day. In addition to the American Mission School, another foreign private school was opened in 1910; Al-Ittihad school, funded by the Persian community of Bahrain.

Following the end of the First World War, Western ideas became more widespread in the country, culminating in the opening of the first public school of Bahrain, Al-Hidaya Al-Khalifia Boys school, in the island of Muharraq in 1919. The school was founded by prominent citizens of Muharraq and was endorsed by the Bahraini royal family. The country's first Education Committee was established by several leading Bahraini merchants, headed by Shaikh Abdulla bin Isa Al-Khalifa, the son of the then-ruler of Bahrain Isa ibn Ali Al Khalifa, who acted as the de facto Minister of Education. The Education Committee was also responsible for managing the Al-Hidaya Boys school. The school was, in fact, the brainchild of Shaikh Abdulla, who suggested the idea after returning from post-World War I celebrations in England.

In 1926, a second public school for boys opened up in Manama called the Jafaria School. Two years later, in 1928, the first public school for girls was established. Due to financial constraints suffered by the Education Committee, the Bahraini government took control of the schools in 1930.

Presently, Manama has a wide range of private and public universities and colleges such as Ahlia University, Applied Science University, Arab Open University, Arabian Gulf University, Bahrain Institute of Banking and Finance, and the College of Health and Sport Sciences. Other notable primary and secondary schools situated in the city include the Bahrain School, the Indian School, Al Raja School amongst others.

Geography 

The city is located in the north-eastern corner of Bahrain on a small peninsula. As in the rest of Bahrain, the land is generally flat (or gently rolling) and arid.

Climate 

Manama has an arid climate. Average temperatures of the summer and winter seasons are generally from about 17 °C (63 °F) to about 34 °C (93 °F). The most pleasant time in Bahrain is autumn when sunshine is comparatively low, coupled with warm temperatures tempered by soft breezes.

Culture 

The country attracts a large number of foreigners and foreign influences, with just under one-third of the population hailing from abroad. Alcohol is legal in the country, with bars and nightclubs operating in the city. Bahrain gave women the right to vote in elections for the first time in 2002. Football is the most popular sport in Manama (and the rest of the country), with three teams from Manama participating in the Bahraini Premier League.

Notable cultural sites within Manama include the Bab Al Bahrain and the adjacent souq area. In the 2010s, the historic core of Manama underwent revitalisation efforts alongside the Manama souq, which were due to be completed in 2020. The central areas of Manama are also the main location for Muharram processions in the country, attracting hundreds of thousands of people annually from Bahrain and across the Gulf.

Notable people
 

Hamad Al Fardan (born 1987), racing driver and musician
Faisal Buressli (born 1961), former basketball player and current coach

Twin towns and sister cities

See also 
 Outline of Bahrain

Notes

References

Citations

Bibliography

Primary sources

Secondary sources

External links 

 

 
Capitals in Asia
Former municipalities (regions) of Bahrain
Former Portuguese colonies
European colonisation in Asia
Populated coastal places in Bahrain
Populated places in the Capital Governorate, Bahrain
Port cities and towns of the Persian Gulf